The Special Branch Bureau or SBB is a Law enforcement agency under the Royal Thai Police Headquarters. Special Branch Bureau has major security functions to the king, queen and all the royal family along with the action on the intelligence of the person or group that acts as a threat to national security. The agency was established on 17 November 1932 (Thai solar calendar year 2475) by Royal Decree of His Majesty King Prajadhipok's by the advise of The House of Representatives. As a result, the department is divided into four divisions. Sometimes referred to by critics as the "political police", it is responsible for controlling subversive activities and serves as the Thai Police's major intelligence organization, as well as the unit responsible for VIP protection.

History

A Special Branch Bureau (SBB) division exists in the Royal Thai Police as part of its Crime Prevention and Suppression Support Group. Aside from intelligence gathering, they provide protection to VIPs alongside the Bangkok Metropolitan Police Bureau (MPB) and Armed Forces Security Centre. They handle matters that have to do with citizenship, such as the renunciation of Thai nationality. Foreign nationals living in Thailand go to the Special Branch office to secure a Thai police clearance certificate. Other cases such as lèse majesté, terrorism, and anything that endangers Thai national security are also handled by the Thai SBB.

The SBB worked with the Malaysian Special Branch during the Cold War. During that time, SBB officers were involved in the Red Drum killings, in which 3,008 accused of being pro-communist were burned to death from  red drums alive or semi-conscious and incinerated during the administration of Prime Minister Thanom Kittikachorn.

The SBB was accused of human rights violations toward Falun Gong practitioners. They have been promoted as a means of routing political opposition to the government. The division stirred controversy in the run-up to the 2007 general election when media revealed that the SBB had conducted its own opinion poll to assess the probable electoral outcome. In response to similar stories before the 2011 general election, the SB characterised its gathering of data as a study rather than a poll.

A special police unit called the "Black Tiger" is under the control of the Special Branch. It handles VIP protection operations.

Mission
 Offering safety for Thai Royal Family
 Operations intelligence about individuals or groups of individuals whose behavior is a threat to national security
 Action on job creators intelligence to the police and centered on the integration of the implementation of the Strategy of National Security
 Action on the job security of important people and places related to national security
 Implementation of the Law on Nationality and other laws related to national security authority
 Training for human resource development

Organization

Royal Thai Police Special Branch Bureau Headquarters
 General Staff Division Special Branch Bureau''' 
 Special Branch Division 1
 Special Branch Division 2
 Special Branch Division 3
 Special Branch Division 4
 Intelligence Development Center

See also
 Special Branch

References

Thai intelligence agencies
Sub-departmental government bodies of Thailand
Law enforcement agencies in Asia
Royal Thai Police